Shrewsbury Castle Blues F.C. were a football club based in Shrewbury, England. The club are recorded as playing their home games at the Racecourse at Monkmoor, Shrewsbury.

History
Castle Blues were formed around 1877 by grammar school old boys, and initially played at Sutton Lane. In 1881 the Shrewsbury Engineers were amalgamated into the club.

The club entered the Welsh Cup in 1881–82, and again in 1884–85, and 1885–86.

The club were a very rough team and were forced to disband by the Birmingham FA in April 1886. The club ceased to exist in that month and was absorbed into Shrewsbury Town when they were reformed in May 1886.

Cup History

Honours

Cups
Shropshire Senior Cup
Winners (1): 1885
Runner Up (2): 1883, 1884

Notable players
 Clopton Lloyd-Jones - 1880 FA Cup winner with Clapham Rovers

References

Sport in Shrewsbury
Defunct football clubs in Shropshire
 
Defunct football clubs in England
Association football clubs disestablished in 1886
Association football clubs established in 1877
1877 establishments in England